Macedonia Baptist Church, more commonly known as Michigan Street Baptist Church, is a historic African American Baptist church located at Buffalo in Erie County, New York.  It is a brick church constructed in 1845. Samuel H. Davis was the congregation's fifth pastor, helped raise money for a church building, and as a mason did much of the construction himself. He gave the welcoming address at the 1843 National Convention of Colored Citizens of America.

Rev. J. Edward Nash (1868–1957) served the congregation from 1892 to 1953.  His home, the Rev. J. Edward Nash, Sr. House, is located nearby.

It was listed on the National Register of Historic Places in 1974.

In 2013, the church was the subject of a thorough historic structure report, which is available in hard copy at three Buffalo libraries.

References

External links
 Buffalo as an Architectural Museum, Michigan Street Baptist Church
 African American Registry, Michigan Street Baptist Church
 People Associated with the Michigan Street Baptist Church by Dr. Judith Wellman and The Buffalo History Museum.

Churches on the National Register of Historic Places in New York (state)
African-American history in Buffalo, New York
Churches completed in 1845
19th-century Baptist churches in the United States
Churches in Buffalo, New York
Churches on the Underground Railroad
National Register of Historic Places in Buffalo, New York
Underground Railroad in New York (state)